Former Fire Station may refer to:

in Australia
Former Fire Station (Walhalla, Victoria), Victoria Heritage Register

in the United States
Former Fire Station (Windsor, Connecticut), listed on the National Register of Historic Places (NRHP)

See also
List of fire stations, which includes numerous former fire stations